Bolqan (also Romanized as Bolqān; also known as Bolgān) is a village in Varqeh Rural District, in the Central District of Charuymaq County, East Azerbaijan Province, Iran. At the 2006 census, its population was 97, in 21 families.

Name 
According to Vladimir Minorsky, the name "Bolqan" is derived from the Mongolian female given name Bulghan (or Bulaghan), which means "sable marten" and was borne by several historical Mongol princesses.

References 

Populated places in Charuymaq County